Goldsmith–Schiffman Field is a multi-purpose stadium in Huntsville, Alabama. From 1934 through 2012, it was used mainly for middle school and high school football. It was also home to the Huntsville Rockets from 1962 through 1967 and the now-defunct Alabama Renegades of the National Women's Football Association.

History

On January 25, 1934, Oscar Goldsmith, Lawrence B. Goldsmith, Annie Schiffman Goldsmith, Robert L. Schiffman, and Elsie Strauss Schiffman gave the property to the city for an "athletic field or playground "for the enjoyment of the white students of the public schools." The Civil Works Administration provided $6,500 in materials and labor to construct the field, the first in Huntsville to accommodate night athletic games. The field was dedicated during the first night game on October 4, 1934, when 1,000 fans saw Coach Milton Frank's Huntsville High team defeat Gadsden High.

The racist language in the deed was ruled unenforceable and ignored as desegregation came to Huntsville City Schools.

The city moved activities to Louis Crews Stadium at Alabama A&M University in 2012, and because of disuse, heirs reclaimed title to the land. On September 5, 2014, after consulting with heirs "as far away as Scotland," Margaret Ann Goldsmith deeded the property to the city again, this time without restriction.

References

External links
Goldsmith–Schiffman Field at City of Huntsville, Alabama

Sports venues in Huntsville, Alabama
1934 establishments in Alabama
Huntsville-Decatur, AL Combined Statistical Area
Multi-purpose stadiums in the United States
High school football venues in the United States
Sports venues completed in 1934
American football venues in Alabama
New Deal in Alabama
Civil Works Administration